Oooh So Good 'n Blues is the sixth studio American blues album by Taj Mahal.

Track listing
 "Buck Dancer's Choice" (Traditional; arranged by Taj Mahal)
 "Little Red Hen" (Mahal)
 "Oh Mama Don't You Know" (Mahal)
 "Frankie and Albert" (Mississippi John Hurt)
 "Railroad Bill" (John Work)
 "Dust My Broom" (Elmore James)
 "Built for Comfort" (Willie Dixon)
 "Teacup's Jazzy Blues Tune" (Mahal)

Personnel
Taj Mahal - rhythm and electric guitar, mandolin, resonator guitar, acoustic bass, piano, blues harp
Pointer Sisters - vocals on "Little Red Hen", "Frankie and Albert" and "Teacup's Jazzy Blues Tune"
Raphael Grinage - acoustic bass on "Built For Comfort"

References

1973 albums
Taj Mahal (musician) albums
Columbia Records albums